Chujar (also Romanized as Chūjār and Jūjār) is a village in Kakavand-e Sharqi Rural District, Kakavand District, Delfan County, Lorestan Province, Iran. At the 2006 census, its population was 92, in 18 families.

References 

Towns and villages in Delfan County